Nalin Nipiko (born 21 September 1995) is a Vanuatuan cricketer who is the current captain of the Vanuatu national cricket team. He started is career in 2009, playing for the under-15s team, and he played in the 2013 ICC World Cricket League Division Six tournament.

Career
In March 2018, he was named in Vanuatu's squad for the 2018 ICC World Cricket League Division Four tournament in Malaysia. In August 2018, he was named in Vanuatu's squad for Group A of the 2018–19 ICC World Twenty20 East Asia-Pacific Qualifier tournament.

In March 2019, he was named in the Vanuatuan squad for the Regional Finals of the 2018–19 ICC World Twenty20 East Asia-Pacific Qualifier tournament. He made his Twenty20 International (T20I) debut for Vanuatu against Papua New Guinea on 22 March 2019. During the Regional Finals, he scored 124 runs and took five wickets in the four matches he played, and was named the Player of the Tournament.

In June 2019, he was selected to represent the Vanuatu cricket team in the men's tournament at the 2019 Pacific Games. In September 2019, he was named in Vanuatu's squad for the 2019 Malaysia Cricket World Cup Challenge League A tournament. He made his List A debut for Vanuatu, against Canada, in the Cricket World Cup Challenge League A tournament on 17 September 2019. He finished the tournament as the leading run-scorer for Vanuatu, with 133 runs in five matches.

References

External links
 

1995 births
Living people
Vanuatuan cricketers
Vanuatu Twenty20 International cricketers
Place of birth missing (living people)